Akwa Ibom South Senatorial District in Akwa Ibom State in Nigeria covers 12 local government areas 

These areas include Ikot Abasi, Mkpat Enin,  Eastern Obolo, Onna, Eket,  Esit Eket,  Ibeno, Okobo, Oron,  UdungUko, Urueoffong/Oruko and Mbo.  Akwa Ibom South senate district 871 polling units (Pus) and 127 registration areas (RAs). 

The collation centre of this district is Eket LGA INEC office.  Akon Eyakenyi of the PDP is the current representative of Akwa Ibom t.

List of senators representing Akwa Ibom South

References 

Politics of Akwa Ibom State
Senatorial districts in Nigeria